T'as vu ? is an album by French parody rap group Fatal Bazooka. It released in 2007 and contains 19 songs, five of which were released as singles : "Fous ta cagoule", "Mauvaise foi nocturne", "J'aime trop ton boule", "Trankillement" and "Parle à ma main".

Track listing
"Intro: T'As Vu" ("Did you see") - 1:37
"Fous ta cagoule" (Literally: "Put your hood on") - 3:25
"Viens Bégère" ("Come beger") - 3:47
"J'aime trop ton boule" ("Thumbnail Watch") - 3:37
"Mc Chamallow" - 1:06
"Viva Bazooka" - 4:37
"Saturday Night Kebab" 3:34
"Ouais Ma Gueule" ("Yeah my mouth")- 3:42
"Ego Trip" - 4:16
"Mc Introverti" - 0:39
"Mauvaise foi nocturne" (feat. Vitoo) - 6:07
"Sale Connasse" ("Dirty asshole) - 3:57
"Chienne de Vie" ("Life's a bitch", "Chienne" is the female form for a dog in French) - 3:44
"C'est une Pute" ("She's a slut") - 1:34
"Auto-Clash" - 4:52
"Mc Québec City" - 1:45
"Parle à ma main" (feat. Yelle) ("Talk to the hand")  - 4:12
"Trankillement" ("Quietly") - 3:26
"Crêpes au Froment" ("Wheat Pancakes") - 5:56

References 

2007 albums
Michaël Youn albums
French-language albums